Suoyarvi is a town and the administrative center of Suoyarvsky District of the Republic of Karelia, Russia, located  northwest of Petrozavodsk. Population:

History

It is known that during the 16th and 17th centuries a settlement existed here known as Shuyezersky pogost (a Russian form of the local Karelian name, meaning "swampy lake"). The first documented mention dates from 1589 when Suoyarvi is recorded as church community controlled by the Orthodox community of Sortavala. In 1630, Suoyarvi became an independent community.

An outcome of the Winter War was that most of West Karelia was occupied by the Soviet Union in 1940, when Suoyarvi was granted town status. In August 1941, the territory was re-occupied by Finnish troops, but as part of the wider post-war settlement, it reverted to the Soviets in 1944; it was the second largest territory by area (after Petsamo) ceded by Finland to the Soviet Union following the Continuation War. Before the occupation, Suoyarvi was geographically the easternmost municipality of Finland.

Suoyarvi had its own dialects of the Karelian language before the area was ceded to the Soviet Union and its inhabitants were relocated to other parts of Finland. Most of the Karelian people in the former municipality spoke a variety of South Karelian (suvikarjala), while the villages in the Hyrsylä (Khyursyulya) salient, which also included Ignoila (Ignoyla) and Hautavaara (Khautavaara), spoke a Livvi dialect instead.

Administrative and municipal status
Within the framework of administrative divisions, Suoyarvi serves as the administrative center of Suoyarvsky District, to which it is directly subordinated. As a municipal division, the town of Suoyarvi is incorporated within Suoyarvsky Municipal District as Suoyarvskoye Urban Settlement.

Transportation
The town serves as a railway junction along the railway line linking Helsinki with St. Petersburg and Petrozavodsk. From Suoyarvi, a line branches off to Yushkozero and Kostomuksha. In the Cold War it was the nearest town to the Maysionvara airbase.

Sister city
 Joensuu, Finland

References

Notes

Sources

Cities and towns in the Republic of Karelia
Former municipalities of Finland
Monotowns in Russia
Suoyarvsky District
Renamed localities of Karelia